The 14th Lumières Awards ceremony, presented by the Académie des Lumières, was held on 19 January 2009. The ceremony was presided by Jeanne Balibar. The Class won the award for Best Film.

Winners and nominees
Winners are listed first and highlighted in bold.
{| class=wikitable style="width="150%"
|-
! style="background:#EEDD82;" ! style="width="50%" | Best Film
! style="background:#EEDD82;" ! style="width="50%" | Best Director
|-
|valign="top" |
The Class
Mesrine: Killer Instinct & Mesrine: Public Enemy Number One
A Christmas Tale
Séraphine
With a Little Help from Myself
| valign="top" |
François Dupeyron — With a Little Help from Myself Arnaud Desplechin — A Christmas Tale Laurent Cantet — The Class Jean-Francois Richet — Mesrine: Killer Instinct & Mesrine: Public Enemy Number One Martin Provost — Séraphine|-
! style="background:#EEDD82;" ! style="width="50%" | Best Actor
! style="background:#EEDD82;" ! style="width="50%" | Best Actress
|-
| valign="top" |
Vincent Cassel — Mesrine: Killer Instinct & Mesrine: Public Enemy Number One André Dussollier — Cortex
 Claude Rich — With a Little Help from Myself 
 Albert Dupontel — Love Me No More
 Kad Merad — Bienvenue chez les Ch'tis
 Guillaume Depardieu — Versailles
| valign="top" | Yolande Moreau — Séraphine Catherine Frot — Mark of an Angel
 Felicite Wouassi — With a Little Help from Myself 
 Kristin Scott Thomas — I've Loved You So Long
 Sylvie Testud — Sagan
|-
! style="background:#EEDD82;" ! style="width="50%" | Most Promising Actor
! style="background:#EEDD82;" ! style="width="50%" | Most Promising Actress
|-
| valign="top" |Mohamed Bouchaïb — Masquerades Emile Berling — Behind the Walls
 François Civil — Dying or Feeling Better
 Anton Balekdjian — Un monde à nous
 Marco Cortes — Khamsa
| valign="top" |Nora Arnezeder — Paris 36 Bertille Noël-Bruneau — The Fox and the Child
 Karina Testa — Dolls and Angels
 Leïla Bekhti — Dolls and Angels
 Léa Seydoux — The Beautiful Person
 Sara Reguigue — Masquerades
|-
! style="background:#EEDD82;" ! style="width="50%" | Best Screenplay
! style="background:#EEDD82;" ! style="width="50%" | Best French-Language Film
|-
| valign="top" |I Always Wanted to Be a Gangster — Samuel Benchetrit The Class — François Bégaudeau, Robin Campillo and Laurent Cantet
 Séraphine — Marc Abdelnour and Martin Provost
 Bienvenue chez les Ch'tis — Dany Boon, Alexandre Charlot and Franck Magnier
 Louise Hires a Contract Killer — Benoît Delépine and Gustave Kervern
| valign="top" |Lorna's Silence Johnny Mad Dog
 Home 
 Rumba 
 Faro: Goddess of the Waters 
|-
! style="background:#EEDD82;" ! style="width="50%" | Best Cinematography
! style="background:#EEDD82;" ! style="width="50%" | World Audience Award(presented by TV5Monde)
|-
| align="center" valign="top" |Agnès Godard — Home| align="center" valign="top" |The Class — Laurent Cantet'''
|}

See also
 34th César Awards

References

External links
 
 
 14th Lumières Awards at AlloCiné''

Lumières Awards
Lumieres
Lumieres